That! Feels Good! is the upcoming fifth studio album by English singer-songwriter Jessie Ware, set to be released on 28 April 2023 via PMR Records and EMI Records.

Background and release 
The album is set to release on 28 April 2023, 3 years after the release of Ware's fourth studio album What's Your Pleasure?, released in 2020. It received widespread critical acclaim for its "disco-inspired" sound. Pitchfork placed the upcoming album on its list for "The 34 Most Anticipated Albums of 2023", with Marc Hogan stating that "Ware stayed well within that 'sex and dancing' sweet spot" following the release of her single "Free Yourself", released on July 19, 2022 as a "taster" to the album.

Ware has teased tracks of various genres including R&B, house and soul. In an interview with Primavera Sound's "RPS Presents" podcast, she described the record as "Remember Where You Are" but a "bit more soulful".

The album's title was unofficially announced in January through a set of billboards in London of Ware. This was later confirmed by Ware on 3 February 2023 in a social media post asking fans "Can you feel it?", with the official announcement coinciding with the release of the single "Pearls" on 9 February. 

A teaser of "Pearls" was released on 6 February, with the track being released on 9 February following a premiere on The Zoe Ball Breakfast Show on BBC Radio 2.

Track listing

Release history

References 

2023 albums
Jessie Ware albums
Upcoming albums